Punch Bowl Falls is a waterfall on Eagle Creek in the Columbia River Gorge National Scenic Area, Oregon, United States. Eagle Creek drains into the Columbia River, with its outlet on the Columbia River Gorge in Multnomah County.

Eagle Creek cuts through a narrow channel and shoots powerfully into a large bowl that resembles a punchbowl. This waterfall was responsible for the waterfall classification type of punchbowl.

These falls are not to be confused with another set of falls with the same name, found in Jasper National Park, Alberta, Canada near Miette Hot Springs.

In 2017, the cliff on the left side of the creek collapsed between Punch Bowl and Lower Punch Bowl Falls. Debris from the landslide changed the stream's flow between waterfalls.

A little up the river, there is a dilapidated wooden staircase leading to a concrete fish ladder.

Nearby waterfalls
Metlako Falls
High Bridge Falls
Sorenson Falls
Tish Creek Falls
Twister Falls

Gallery

See also
List of waterfalls on Eagle Creek and its tributaries

External links
 Punch Bowl Falls at GoSleepGo
  Punch Bowl Falls at waterfallsnorthwest.com
 Lower Punch Bowl Falls at waterfallsnorthwest.com

Columbia River Gorge
Waterfalls of Hood River County, Oregon
Mount Hood National Forest
Punch bowl waterfalls
Waterfalls of Oregon